Justice Peterson may refer to:

C. Donald Peterson (1918–1987), associate justice of the Minnesota Supreme Court
Edwin J. Peterson (born 1930), chief justice of the Oregon Supreme Court
Henry K. Peterson (1884–1966), associate justice of the Iowa Supreme Court

See also
Judge Peterson (disambiguation)